Wendy Katrina Justice (née Fraser; born 23 April 1963 in Bukoba, Kagera, Tanzania) is a former field hockey player from Scotland, who was a member of the British squad that won the bronze medal at the 1992 Summer Olympics in Barcelona. Affiliated with Glasgow Western Ladies she competed in two consecutive Summer Olympics, starting in 1988 Summer Olympics. She currently coaches the 1XI team at Glasgow University Women's Hockey Club.

External links
 
 
 
 
 

1963 births
Living people
Scottish female field hockey players
Field hockey players at the 1988 Summer Olympics
Field hockey players at the 1992 Summer Olympics
Olympic field hockey players of Great Britain
British female field hockey players
Olympic bronze medallists for Great Britain
Olympic medalists in field hockey
Scottish Olympic medallists
Medalists at the 1992 Summer Olympics
People from Bukoba